The following is a list of South Korean films scheduled to be released in 2023.

Box office
The highest-grossing South Korean films released in 2023, by domestic box office gross revenue, are as follows:

Released
 Denotes a film that was publicly screened before its theatrical release, be it through film festivals, premieres or releases in other countries

January – March

April – June

See also
 List of 2023 box office number-one films in South Korea
 2023 in South Korea

References

External links

 

South Korean
2023
2023 in South Korean cinema